Frederick George Stewart (11 April 1875 – 21 December 1941) was an Australian rules footballer who played with St Kilda in the Victorian Football League (VFL).

References

External links 

1875 births
1941 deaths
Australian rules footballers from Melbourne
St Kilda Football Club players